The Aero L-39NG ("Next Generation") is a turbofan-powered military trainer and light combat aircraft developed and produced by the Czech aircraft manufacturer Aero Vodochody. It is a successor of the Cold War era Aero L-39 Albatros.

During July 2014, Aero Vodochody announced the launch of the L-39NG programme. By April 2015, the company revealed a partnership between itself, Draken International and Williams International to jointly work on the project - the latter provides its FJ44-4M turbofan engine for the aircraft, while Draken shall be responsible to the type on the North American market, as well as operate its own fleet. On 14 September 2015, the maiden flight of the L-39NG technology demonstrator (L-39CW) was performed. On 14 March 2018, type certification of the L-39CW was received. On 22 December 2018, the first L-39NG prototype conducted its first flight. In September 2020, the Czech defence ministry certificated the L39NG using supranational military standards.

The L-39NG project has been divided into two distinct stages, or versions. The Stage 1 programme is an upgrade that is available to existing L-39 operators; the original airframes are retrofitted with a new engine and (optionally) modern avionics. The Stage 2 programme involves the production of new-build aircraft; these benefit from several design improvements, such as the use of a wet wing, eliminating the original L-39's distinctive wingtip fuel tanks. During September 2020, the Czech defence ministry certificated the L39NG in accordance with supranational military standards. Numerous civil and military customers have placed orders for the L-39NG, including a dedicated reconnaissance variant.

Design and development
On 16 July 2014, while attending the Farnborough Airshow, Aero Vodochody presented its L-39NG project as a follow-on to its popular Aero L-39 Albatros trainer aircraft. By April 2015, Aero Vodochody had formed a partnership with the American defence services provider Draken International and engine manufacturer Williams International to collaborate on the L-39NG programme; under this agreement, Draken International assumed responsibility for the type in the North American market. For other regions of the world, Aero remains responsible for the modernisation of existing aircraft at their facilities in the Czech Republic.

The L-39NG aircraft is being developed and marketed in two stages. The L-39NG upgrade program (Stage 1) involves an installation of FJ44-4M turbofan engine and optionally the Stage 2 avionics to existing L-39 Albatros. The FJ44-4M engine generated almost identical thrust output to the Soviet-era Ivchenko AI-25 engine that powered the original L-39 series, but at a considerably lower fuel consumption as well as possessing more favourable operating characteristics. On 14 September 2015, the maiden flight of the L-39NG technology demonstrator (L-39CW) was performed, the first stage of development was declared to be complete that same month. On 20 November 2017, Aero Vodochody announced they have completed the development of the L-39CW. On 14 March 2018, the company announced that the L-39CW had received type certification, signifying its airworthiness and readiness for serial manufacture.

The second phase (Stage 2) represents newly built L-39NG aircraft with the possible use of components from the previous upgrade to Stage 1, once the original airframe reaches the end of its life. The new airframe is considerably lighter and produces less drag, overall, the redesigned aircraft was said to have comparable operating costs to contemporary turboprops. Amongst other advances, modern composite construction is used. In June 2017, Aero Vodochody unveiled its plan to build four pre-production examples of L-39NG for testing and demonstration. In July 2017, Aero Vodochody began producing parts for the assembly of four aircraft, three of which are to be prototypes and one pre-serial production aircraft.

In April 2018, a partnership agreement was signed between Aero Vodochody and Israel Aerospace Industries (IAI) for the integration of the latter's virtual training solutions onto the L-39NG, in addition to jointly working on other projects. The first L-39NG prototype was rolled out in Odolena Voda on 12 October 2018, and conducted its maiden flight on 22 December 2018. During September 2020, the Czech defence ministry certificated the L39NG in accordance with new supranational military standards recognised by all EU and NATO military authorities; this allows the aircraft to operate in international airspace and that it conforms with all safety requirements. In July 2022, EU/NATO certification to EMAR 21 standards was granted for the baseline version of the L-39NG.

Operational history

Testing
The technology demonstrator L-39CW, a conventional airframe outfitted with the FJ44-4M engine and other retrofitted elements, performed its first flight from Vodochody airport on 14 September 2015. In September 2016, Aero Vodochody announced that it had completed the first phase of testing with the L-39CW, and was now ready to proceed with the development of the more comprehensive new-build L-39NG.

The full prototype L-39NG conducted its maiden flight, as per schedule, on 22 December 2018. In 2019, it was announced that Aero Vodochody was changing the L-39NG's certification schedule, this was reportedly in response to customer demands for increased capability; the move was to facilitate the clearance of deliveries in the full trainer configuration during the latter part of 2020, whereas the earlier intent had been to secure approval for a basic standard sometime in late 2019. By September 2019, a total of three aircraft were involved in the test programme; the L-39CW was being used for avionics testing and investigations of its spin/stall characteristics, while the prototype L-39NG was conducting basic performance testing, including ground vibration testing at the Czech Aerospace Research Centre; reportedly, weapons testing for the light attack role had also been performed.

On 25 May 2020, the L-39NG commenced static fatigue testing, one reported aim of which is to validate the new airframe's operating life of 5,000 flight hours. By September 2020, roughly 300 test flights has been performed by the two flying prototypes, while additional ground-based testing using a pair of static airframes had also been conducted. Aero has claimed that life cycle testing has shown the aircraft to have a viable service life of up to 15,000 flight hours, three times that of the original L-39. The engine's increased efficiency has also reportedly facilitated a maximum range of 1,900km without external fuel tanks, 800km greater than that of the L-39. During January 2022, Aero announced the successful completion of fatigue testing.

Orders
 
2015: The first customer for the L-39NG Stage 1 was announced at the Paris Air Show in June 2015. LOM Praha, a Czech state-owned enterprise, has ordered the L-39NG for use at its Flight Training Center at Pardubice Airport. 
2022: LOM Praha signed agreement for delivery of four L-39NG to replace it's fleet of L-39C used for Czech Air Force training.
 
Draken International signed an agreement with Aero Vodochody for up to six of the L-39s of Draken's display team to receive the L-39NG upgrade in 2015. 
RSW Aviation placed an order for 12 L-39NG and six L-39CW at the 2018 Farnborough Airshow
 
Breitling Jet Team ordered upgrade of its existing L-39 fleet to L-39NG in 2018.
 
Senegal ordered for four L-39NGs outfitted to perform both light attack and training duties in April 2018. However, by March 2022, it was reported that the Senegalese Air Force had opted to cancel the order.
 
Skytech, a company based in Portugal, placed an order for 12 L-39NGs at the 2018 Farnborough Airshow. The order includes an option for another six.
 
Vietnam ordered 12 L-39NG trainers to Vietnam in February 2021. The order includes assorted spare parts, equipment for ground-based training, logistics support, and specialised airport systems. This batch of the new-build L-39NGs will be delivered to Vietnam's People Air Force from 2023 through to 2024. First airframes are reportedly being assembled at Vodochody.
 
Parliament of Ghana had approved a €111,4 million performance sales and purchase agreement for the supply of six L-39NG training and light combat aircraft for the Ghana Air Force in December 2021.
 
Hungary ordered eight L-39NG trainers along with four reconnaissance-oriented L-39NG aircraft in April 2022. At the time of the deal, the terms of which are being kept confidential, the latter version was still in the development phase.

Variants

L-39CW 
Technology demonstrator of the L-39NG based on the L-39C airframe, powered by a Williams International FJ44-4M turbofan engine.

L-39NG Stage 1 
Re-engined L-39 Albatros powered by the Williams International FJ44-4M turbofan. This version has the original "dry" wing with wingtip fuel tanks. Optionally includes an installation of the L-39NG Stage 2 avionics.

L-39NG Stage 2 
New-build L-39NG trainer aircraft, outfitted with Genesys Aerosystems avionics suite and glass cockpit. The new airframe is equipped with a new wet wing with internal fuel tanks and five hardpoints; it is powered by a FJ44-4M engine.

Reconnaissance version 
Hungary ordered four reconnaissance version of the L-39NG to be developed and produced. For this purpose, it is furnished with a Wescam-supplied MX-15E electro-optical day and night sensor mounted beneath the fuselage.

Specifications (L-39NG Stage 2)

See also

References

Citations

External links

 L-39 Next Generation (Aero Vodochody) 
 L-39 Next Generation (Draken International) 

L-39NG
Single-engined jet aircraft
Low-wing aircraft
Aircraft first flown in 2015
2010s Czech aircraft